Melissa Wilcox (born February 8, 1983) is a female former British gymnast.

Gymnastics career
Wilcox represented England and won a silver medal in the team event, at the 1998 Commonwealth Games in Kuala Lumpur, Malaysia.

References

1983 births
Living people
British female artistic gymnasts
Gymnasts at the 1998 Commonwealth Games
Commonwealth Games silver medallists for England
Commonwealth Games medallists in gymnastics
Medallists at the 1998 Commonwealth Games